Rõngu Parish was a rural municipality in Tartu County, Estonia.

Estonian artist Konrad Mägi (1878-1925) was born in Rõngu Parish.

Settlements
Small boroughs
Käärdi - Rõngu

Villages
Kalme - Käo - Kirepi - Kõduküla - Koruste - Lapetukme - Lossimäe - Piigandi - Raigaste - Rannaküla - Tammiste - Teedla - Tilga - Uderna - Valguta

Gallery

Twinnings
 Laukaa Municipality, Finland

References

External links

 

Municipalities of Estonia
Populated places in Tartu County